Battle of Solskjell may refer to either of two battles that took place ca. the year 870 AD in the process of unification of Norway:

 First battle of Solskjell
 Second battle of Solskjell